Saidabad-e Sofla (also Romanized as Sa‘īdābād-e Soflá and Sa‘id Abad Sofla; also known as Safīdābād-e Soflá and Sa‘īdābād-e Pā’īn) is a village in Saidabad Rural District of the Central District of Ijrud County, Zanjan province, Iran. At the 2006 National Census, its population was 913 in 266 households. The following census in 2011 counted 1,280 people in 418 households. The latest census in 2016 showed a population of 976 people in 341 households; it was the largest village in its rural district.

References 

Ijrud County

Populated places in Zanjan Province

Populated places in Ijrud County